Cerro Corá may refer to:

Argentina
Cerro Corá, Misiones

Brazil
Cerro Corá, Rio Grande do Norte

Paraguay
Cerro Corá (hill)
Battle of Cerro Corá, 1870
Cerro Corá, Alto Paraguay
Cerro Corá, Amambay 
Cerro Cora (film) 
Club Cerro Corá, a football team

See also